Abronica is a genus of sea slugs, aeolid nudibranchs. It is the only genus in the family Abronicidae, which was first named in 2017.

Species within the genus Abronica include:
 Abronica abronia (MacFarland, 1966)
 Abronica purpureoanulata'' Baba, 1961

References

Abronicidae
Gastropod genera